Alada Halli is a village in the southern state of Karnataka, India. It is located in the Malavalli taluk of Mandya district in Karnataka.

See also
 Districts of Karnataka
 Mandya

References

External links
 http://Mandya.nic.in/

Villages in Mandya district